Felix Hoffmann may refer to:

Felix Hoffmann (1868–1946), German chemist
Felix Hoffmann (basketball) (born 1989), German basketball player
Felix Hoffmann (illustrator) (1911–1975), Swiss graphic designer, illustrator and stained glass artist